The ceremonial county of Berkshire currently comprises the unitary authorities of Bracknell Forest, Reading, Slough, West Berkshire, Windsor and Maidenhead and Wokingham. From 1997, it has returned eight MPs to the UK Parliament.

As a result of the local government reorganisation introduced by the Local Government Act 1972, which came into effect on 1 April 1974, the boundaries of the historic/administrative county were substantially altered. Northern parts of the county were transferred to Oxfordshire while southernmost parts of Buckinghamshire, including the Borough of Slough, were added. This was reflected in the following redistribution of parliamentary seats which came into effect for the 1983 general election.

Number of seats 
The table below shows the number of MPs representing Berkshire at each major redistribution of seats affecting the county.

1Prior to 1950, seats were classified as County Divisions or Parliamentary Boroughs. Since 1950, they have been classified as County or Borough Constituencies.

Timeline

Boundary reviews

See also 

 List of parliamentary constituencies in Berkshire

References 

Parliamentary constituencies in Berkshire (historic)